The 2005 North Carolina Tar Heels football team represented the University of North Carolina at Chapel Hill as a member of Coastal Division of the Atlantic Coast Conference (ACC) during the 2005 NCAA Division I-A football season. Led by fifth-year head coach John Bunting, the Tar Heels played their home games at Kenan Memorial Stadium in Chapel Hill, North Carolina. North Carolina finished the season 5–6 overall and 4–4 in ACC play to place fourth in the Coastal Division.

Schedule

Coaching staff

Roster

Team statistics

References

North Carolina
North Carolina Tar Heels football seasons
North Carolina Tar Heels football